Alma Dagbjört Möller (born 24 June 1961) is an Icelandic doctor. On 1 April 2018 she became the first woman to serve as the Director of Health since the office was established in 1760. Since February 2020, she has been one of the lead members of the Iceland's Department of Civil Protection and Emergency Management addressing the COVID-19 pandemic in Iceland.

Early life
Alma was born in Siglufjörður to Helena Sigtryggsdóttir and Jóhann Georg Möller. She was the youngest of 6 siblings that included Kristján L. Möller, a former parliamentarian and Minister of Communications.

In May 1990, she became the first woman to serve as a helicopter doctor for the Icelandic Coast Guard.

See also
COVID-19 vaccination in Iceland

References

1961 births
Living people
University of Iceland alumni
20th-century women physicians
21st-century women physicians
Icelandic public health doctors
Women public health doctors